Julius Rosenwald (August 12, 1862 – January 6, 1932) was an American businessman and philanthropist. He is best known as a part-owner and leader of Sears, Roebuck and Company, and for establishing the Rosenwald Fund, which donated millions in matching funds to promote vocational or technical education. In 1919 he was appointed to the Chicago Commission on Race Relations. He was also the principal founder and backer for the Museum of Science and Industry in Chicago, to which he gave more than $5 million and served as president from 1927 to 1932.

Early life

Julius Rosenwald was born in 1862 to the clothier Samuel Rosenwald and his wife Augusta (Hammerslough), a Jewish immigrant couple from Germany. He was born and raised just a few blocks from Abraham Lincoln's residence in Springfield, Illinois, during Lincoln's presidency. In 2020, the house, formerly known as Lyon House, was renamed in his honor, and a plaque erected.

By his sixteenth year, Rosenwald was apprenticed by his parents to his uncles in New York City to learn the clothing trades. While in New York, he befriended Henry Goldman and Henry Morgenthau Sr. With his younger brother Morris, Rosenwald started a clothing manufacturing company. They were ruined by a recession in 1885.

Rosenwald had heard about other clothiers who had begun to manufacture clothing according to standardized sizes from data collected during the American Civil War. He decided to try the system but to move his manufacturing facility closer to the rural population that he anticipated would be his market.  He and his brother moved to Chicago, Illinois. Once in Chicago, the Rosenwald brothers enlisted more help from a cousin, Julius Weil; together they founded Rosenwald and Weil Clothiers.

Marriage and family
In 1890, Rosenwald married Augusta "Gussie" Nusbaum, a daughter of a competing clothier. Together they had five children: Lessing J. Rosenwald, Adele (Rosenwald) Deutsch Levy, Edith (Rosenwald) Stern, Marion (Rosenwald) Ascoli―second wife of Italian American journalist Max Ascoli―and William Rosenwald. Their son Lessing Rosenwald became a prominent businessman, following his father in the chairmanship of Sears, Roebuck & Company (1932–1939). Edith married businessman Edgar B. Stern Sr.

One of his grandchildren is Nina Rosenwald. Another was the Hollywood film producer Armand Deutsch, who believed that he was the intended target of the thrill killers Leopold and Loeb, who kidnapped and murdered his schoolmate Robert "Bobby" Franks on May 21, 1924.

Sears, Roebuck & Company

In 1893, Richard Sears and Alvah C. Roebuck renamed their watch company Sears, Roebuck & Company and began to diversify. Rosenwald and Weil was a principal supplier of men's clothing for Sears, Roebuck. The volumes of unsold merchandise caused by the Panic of 1893 and his declining health led Roebuck to leave the company.

Roebuck placed his interest in the company in the hands of Sears who, in turn, offered that half of the company be sold to Chicago businessman Aaron Nusbaum, who in turn brought in Rosenwald, to whom Sears owed money. In August 1895, Sears sold Roebuck's half of the company to Nusbaum and Rosenwald for $75,000. The new Sears, Roebuck and Company was re-incorporated in Illinois with a capital stock of $150,000 in August 1895. Sears and Rosenwald got along well, but Nusbaum, who was Gussie Rosenwald's brother, was a problem. Sears and Rosenwald bought him out for $1.3 million in 1903.

Rosenwald brought to the company a rational management philosophy and diversified product lines: dry goods, consumer durables, drugs, hardware, furniture, and nearly anything else a farm household could desire. The company's initiative at this time was particularly fortuitous with the initiation of Rural Free Delivery by the Post Office in 1896. From 1895 to 1907, under Rosenwald's leadership as vice president and treasurer, annual sales of the company climbed from $750,000 to upwards of $50 million. The prosperity of the company and their vision for greater expansion led Sears and Rosenwald to take the company public in 1906, with $40 million in stock. Rosenwald turned to his old friend Henry Goldman, who was now a senior partner at Goldman Sachs, to handle the initial public offering of the stock.  After Sears resigned the presidency in 1908 due to declining health, Rosenwald was named president.

On January 2, 1915, Rosenwald was indicted in Chicago for a failure to file a personal property tax schedule. One commenter described the indictment as "a shot heard around the world". Prior to the indictment the Tax Board of Review scheduled the value of Rosenwald's Sears' stock at $7,500,000. Rosenwald declared this to be greatly excessive and additionally claimed that the stock of the New York company did not represent tangible assets. The indictment was quashed in March 1915 when Rosenwald's attorneys convinced the Court that the section of law which provided for prosecution of such cases had been repealed.

The company was laid low during the post-World War I recession as a severe depression hit the nation's farms after farmers had over-expanded their holdings. To bail out the company, Rosenwald pledged $21 million of his personal wealth. By 1922, Sears had regained financial stability. Two years later, in 1924, Rosenwald resigned the presidency, but remained as chairman; his goal was to devote more time to philanthropy. First he oversaw the design and construction of the company's first department store within Sears, Roebuck's massive 16-hectare (40-acre) headquarters complex of offices, laboratories, and mail-order operations at Homan Ave. and Arthington St. on Chicago's West Side. The store opened on February 2, 1925. After leaving the presidency, Rosenwald was appointed chairman of the Board of Sears, a position he held until his death in 1932.

Philanthropy

After the 1906 financial reorganization of Sears, Rosenwald became friends with Goldman Sachs's other senior partner, Paul J. Sachs, who often stayed with Rosenwald during his many trips to Chicago and the two would discuss America's social situation, agreeing that the plight of African Americans was the most serious in the U.S. Sachs introduced Rosenwald to two prominent educators and proponents of African-American education, William H. Baldwin and Booker T. Washington. Rosenwald made common cause with Washington and was asked to serve on the board of directors of the Tuskegee Institute in 1912, a position he held for the remainder of his life. He endowed the institute to free Washington from fundraising and enable him to devote more time managing the institute.

Rosenwald became a member of the city's leading Jewish Reform congregation, Chicago Sinai congregation, soon after moving to Chicago. Its rabbi, Emil G. Hirsch, made a big impact on Rosenwald's philanthropy. Rosenwald donated generously to several Jewish community projects in Chicago and served as vice president of Chicago Sinai for many years.

African American education
Booker T. Washington encouraged Rosenwald to address the poor state of African-American education in the US, which suffered from inadequate buildings and books. Rosenwald provided funds to build six small schools in rural Alabama, which were constructed and opened in 1913 and 1914, and overseen by Tuskegee. As the projects were built by and for African Americans, they showed Rosenwald's intention to remain behind the scenes in this effort. Inspired by the social progressivism of Jane Addams, Grace Abbott, Paul J. Sachs, and the Reform Judaism of Emil Hirsch and Julian Mack (many of whom were personal friends as well), Rosenwald devoted his time, energy, and money to philanthropy.

In his words, written in 1911:

The horrors that are due to race prejudice come home to the Jew more forcefully than to others of the white race, on account of the centuries of persecution which they have suffered and still suffer.

The collaboration between Booker T. Washington and Julius Rosenwald was the subject of the 2015 documentary Rosenwald, subtitled The Remarkable Story of a Jewish Partnership with African American Communities by writer, producer and director Aviva Kempner, which won Best Documentary Jury Award at the Teaneck International Film Festival and the Lipscomb University Prize of the Ecumenical Jury, Nashville Film Festival.

He established his Rosenwald Fund in 1917 for "the well-being of mankind". Unlike other endowed foundations, which were designed to fund themselves in perpetuity, the Rosenwald Fund was intended to use all of its funds for philanthropic purposes. As a result, the fund was completely spent by 1948.

Schools, universities, and museums
Over the course of his life, Rosenwald and his fund donated over $70 million to public schools, colleges and universities, museums, Jewish charities and African-American institutions. The rural school building program was one of the largest programs administered by the Rosenwald Fund. This program eventually was responsible for construction in the South of more than 5,000 schools and shops for African-American children, as well as homes for their teachers. These schools became informally known as "Rosenwald Schools".

Rosenwald commissioned one of Chicago's largest philanthropic housing developments: the Michigan Boulevard Garden Apartments, at 47th St. and Michigan Ave. The Michigan Boulevard Garden Apartments was one of the first American housing developments to mix residential, commercial and social uses and still stands.

The complex was built in 1929 by Julius Rosenwald and his nephew, architect Ernest Grunsfeld (who also designed the Adler Planetarium, at the behest of Rosenwald's brother-in-law, Max Adler). Covering a square block, the buildings enclosed an enormous central landscaped courtyard. Rosenwald planned the development of 421 units to provide sound housing for African Americans and to relieve the tremendous overcrowding due to Chicago's pervasive racial segregation. The development also included 14 stores along the 47th Street side of the property, four of which were occupied by black-owned businesses, and a nursery school. Rosenwald invested $2.7 million in the project, receiving only a 2.4 percent return during the first seven years.

YMCAs for African Americans
In 1910, the YMCA asked Rosenwald to fund a proposal for a new building in Chicago; Rosenwald replied that he would contribute only if a center for African Americans were also constructed. The result was the Wabash Avenue YMCA, opened in 1914, which would later become an historic landmark.  The Wabash "Y" greatly aided blacks' integration into Chicago during the Great Migration.  It is still operating today.

Rosenwald went on to offer challenge grants to cities across the United States to build YMCAs for African Americans. Rosenwald promised to give $25,000 to any city that could raise $75,000 to build a YMCA for African Americans. Between 1911 and 1933, Rosenwald provided over $600,000 toward the building of 25 YMCAs in 24 cities across the United States, including one in Harlem.

Samuel Reshevsky
Rosenwald was the patron of chess prodigy Samuel Reshevsky.  He encouraged Reshevsky to earn a university degree so as not to be completely dependent upon chess for his living.  Reshevsky did so, earning his degree in accounting from the University of Chicago.

County Extension
Rosenwald gave $1000 grants to the first 100 counties in the U.S. to hire County Extension Agents, helping the United States Department of Agriculture launch a program that was highly valuable to rural Americans.  He was also the principal founder and backer for the Museum of Science and Industry in Chicago, to which he gave over $5 million and served as the president (1927–1932).

Death and legacy
Rosenwald died at his home in the Ravinia section of Highland Park, Illinois, on January 6, 1932.

 His bust was created in bronze, and it was among those of eight honored industry magnates which were installed between the Chicago River and the Merchandise Mart in downtown Chicago, Illinois.
During World War II the Liberty ship  was built in Panama City, Florida, and named in his honor.
 He was inducted into the Junior Achievement U.S. Business Hall of Fame in 1992.
 A 2015 film Rosenwald directed by Aviva Kempner documents his life and philanthropy.
 A Chicago Public School system elementary school, located at 2601 W 80th Street on Chicago's Southwest Side, was named after Rosenwald in 1952.
 Rosenwald's boyhood home, which is part of the Lincoln Home National Historic Site, was renamed in his honor in 2020. A plaque there commemorates his work.

References

Sources
 Ascoli, Peter M. Julius Rosenwald: The Man Who Built Sears, Roebuck and Advanced the Cause of Black Education in the American South (Indiana University Press, 2006), the major biography.
 Brinkmann, Tobias, "Sundays at Sinai: A Jewish Congregation in Chicago" (2012), on Rosenwald's Jewish philanthropy.
 Burton, Charles Wesley and Laura Dancy Burton, The North Star: Julius Rosenwald's Impact Upon Black America (2008)
 Diner, Hasia R. Julius Rosenwald: Repairing the World. (Yale University Press, 2017).
 Embree, Edwin R. Investment in People? The Story of the Julius Rosenwald Fund. 1949.
 Emmet, Boris, and John E Jeuck. Catalogs and Counters: A History of Sears, Roebuck and Company (1950), a scholarly history
 Werner, M. R. Julius Rosenwald: The Life of a Practical Humanitarian. 2nd ed. 1939.

External links

 "Rosenwald Apartment Building", Archiplanet.
 The North Star (2008)
 Diane Granat, "Saving the Rosenwald Schools: Preserving African-American History", APF Reporter, Vol. 20 #4, Alicia Patterson Fund
 

Guide to the Julius Rosenwald Papers 1905-1963 at the University of Chicago Special Collections

1862 births
1932 deaths
American people of German-Jewish descent
American retail chief executives
Businesspeople from Chicago
Burials at Rosehill Cemetery
Jewish American philanthropists
People from Springfield, Illinois
.
Sears Holdings people
Rosenwald family
Philanthropists from Illinois
19th-century American businesspeople
20th-century American businesspeople
20th-century American philanthropists
Council of National Defense